The 8th Bersaglieri Regiment is an active unit of the Italian Army based in Caserta in Campania. The regiment is part of the army's infantry corps' Bersaglieri speciality and operationally assigned to the Bersaglieri Brigade "Garibaldi". The regiment is one of the highest decorated units of the Italian Army with two Gold Medals of Military Valour, both of which the regiment earned during the North African campaign of World War II.

Current Structure 
As of 2022 the 8th Bersaglieri Regiment consists of:

  Regimental Command, in Caserta
 Logistic Support Company
 3rd Bersaglieri Battalion "Cernaia"
 1st Fusiliers Company
 2nd Fusiliers Company
 3rd Fusiliers Company
 Maneuver Support Company

The Command and Logistic Support Company fields the following platoons: C3 Platoon, Transport and Materiel Platoon, Medical Platoon, and Commissariat Platoon. The regiment is equipped with tracked Dardo infantry fighting vehicles. The Maneuver Support Company is equipped with M106 120mm mortar carriers and Dardo IFVs with Spike LR anti-tank guided missiles.

See also 
 Bersaglieri

External links
Italian Army Website: 8th Bersaglieri Regiment

References

Bersaglieri Regiments of Italy